Spheterista flavopicta is a moth of the family Tortricidae. It was first described by Lord Walsingham in 1907. It is endemic to the Hawaiian island of Kauai.

The larvae feed on Santalum species.

External links

Archipini
Endemic moths of Hawaii